The third New Zealand Parliament was a term of the Parliament of New Zealand. Elections for this term were held between 12 December 1860 and 28 March 1861 in 43 electorates to elect 53 MPs. Two electorates were added to this during this term, Gold Fields District (overlaid over existing Otago electorates) and a new Dunedin electorate created by splitting the existing City of Dunedin into Dunedin and Suburbs North and Dunedin and Suburbs South, increasing the number of MPs to 57. During the term of this Parliament, six Ministries were in power.

Historical context
The third Parliament opened on 3 June 1861 (after a postponement from the previously announced date of 30 May 1861), following New Zealand's 1860–1861 election. It was the second Parliament under which New Zealand had responsible government, meaning that unlike the first Parliament, the Cabinet was chosen (although not officially appointed) by Parliament rather than by the Governor.

Political parties had not been established yet; this only happened after the 1890 election. Anyone attempting to form an administration thus had to win support directly from individual MPs. This made first forming, and then retaining a government difficult and challenging.

The third Parliament sat during the time of the New Zealand wars. Even before the first session started, William Cutfield King (representing the Grey and Bell electorate) was killed in the First Taranaki War. Marmaduke Nixon (Franklin electorate) was killed in action in 1864 whilst leading an assault on a Māori village during the Invasion of Waikato.

Ministries
Since 1856, the first Stafford Ministry, led by Edward Stafford, was in place. This was the third administration under responsible government, and it was dissolved on 12 July 1861. Stafford was the third Premier of New Zealand. William Fox then formed the second Fox Ministry, which was in place from 12 July 1861 to 6 August 1862. Fox had previously been the Premier under the second administration. Alfred Domett, the fourth Premier, led the fifth administration, the Domett Ministry. This was in place from 6 August 1862 until 30 October 1863.

The Whitaker–Fox Ministry was the next administration, led by Frederick Whitaker as the fifth Premier. This administration was in place from 30 October 1863 to 24 November 1864. This was followed by the Weld Ministry under Frederick Weld as the sixth Premier. This was in place from 24 November 1864 to 16 October 1865. A few months before the 1866 general elections, Stafford once again became Premier on 16 October 1865, leading the second Stafford Ministry. This lasted well into the term of the fourth Parliament on 28 June 1869.

Sessions
Parliament sat for five sessions:

The first session started on 30 May 1861. Ever since Parliament had first met in 1854 in Auckland, an argument was had for the members to meet in a more central place. The second session of the 3rd Parliament was the first to meet outside of Auckland; the buildings of the Wellington Provincial Council were used for this session. A proposal to make this move to Wellington permanent was lost by a single vote.

The fifth session started on 26 July 1865 and Parliament was prorogued on 30 October.

Electoral boundaries for the third Parliament
43 electorates were used for the 1860–61 elections. This was a significant increase from the previous 28 electorates, and resulted from the passage of the Representation Act 1860.

Initial composition of the third Parliament
53 seats were created across the 43 electorates. The City of Wellington electorate was the only three-member electorate, and eight electorates were represented by two members. The remaining 34 electorates were represented by a single member.

Changes during term
There were numerous changes during the term of the third Parliament.

List of by-elections

Existing electorates
Akaroa
White resigned in 1863 and was succeeded by Lancelot Walker.

Auckland West
Firth resigned on 30 April 1862. He was succeeded by James Williamson.

Avon
Creyke resigned on 21 April 1862. He was succeeded by William Thomson.

Bruce
Kettle died on 5 June 1862. Edward Cargill succeeded him in the 1862 by-election. In 1865, Edward Cargill resigned. The resulting second by-election in 1865, held on 26 July, was contested by James Macandrew and John Cargill. Macandrew and J. Cargill received 207 and 34 votes, and Macandrew was declared elected.

Gillies resigned and the subsequent first 1865 by-election was won on 8 April 1865 by Arthur John Burns.

City of Dunedin
Edward McGlashan resigned in 1861. Successors were John Richardson (1862) and James Paterson (1862–63).
Dick resigned in 1863.

The electorate was abolished in 1863 and replaced with the two Dunedin suburb electorates listed below.

Ellesmere
Rowley resigned in 1862 and was succeeded by James FitzGerald.

Franklin
Nixon was killed in action during the Invasion of Waikato on 27 May 1864. He was succeeded by Theodore Haultain.

Grey and Bell
King was killed on 8 February 1861. He was succeeded by Harry Atkinson.

Hampden
Fraser was vacated for absence in 1862. He was succeeded by John Richard Jones who resigned in 1863, and was replaced by Frederick Wayne.

Heathcote
G. Hall resigned in 1862. He was first succeeded by William Sefton Moorhouse (1862–63), then Alfred Cox (1863–65).

Kaiapoi
Cookson resigned in 1863. He was succeeded by Robert Wilkin.

Napier
Stark resigned in 1861. He was succeeded by William Colenso.

New Plymouth
William Richmond resigned in 1862. He was first succeeded by Isaac Newton Watt (1862–63), then Henry Hanson Turton (1863–64), and then Charles Brown (1864–65).

Parnell
Wood resigned in 1865. He was succeeded by Robert James Creighton.

Raglan
Charles John Taylor resigned in 1865. He was succeeded by William Buckland.

Suburbs of Nelson
Wemyss resigned in 1861. He was succeeded by William Wells.

Waimea
Saunders resigned in 1864. He was succeeded by John George Miles.

Wairarapa
Carter resigned in 1865. He was succeeded by Henry Bunny.

New electorates 
Dunedin and Suburbs South
Dunedin and Suburbs South was established in 1862 as a two-member electorate. It was represented by two MPs: William Reynolds (from 4 December 1862) and James Paterson (from 29 April 1863) until the end of the term.

Dunedin and Suburbs North
Dunedin and Suburbs North was established in 1863 as a two-member electorate. It was represented by John Richardson (from 20 April 1863) and Julius Vogel (from 29 September 1863) until the end of the term.

Goldfields
The Goldfields electorate was established in 1862, during the term of the third Parliament. This was a reaction to the large influx of people to Otago during the Otago Gold Rush, and because the franchise had been extended to males aged 21 years and over who had held a miner's right continuously for at least three (or six) months. No electoral rolls were established for these districts, and to vote a miner just presented his miner's licence to the election official. Outside Otago where no special Goldfields electorate existed, miners could register as electors in the ordinary electoral district where they lived.

William Baldwin and George Brodie were elected in the 1863 Goldfields by-election. Baldwin resigned on 27 April 1865. Charles Edward Haughton won the resulting 1865 by-election held on 29 May contested by three candidates.

Notes

References

03
1861 establishments in New Zealand